James J. McGillivray (June 16, 1848 – 1925) was a member of the Wisconsin State Assembly and the Wisconsin State Senate.

Biography
McGillivray was born on June 16, 1848 in Canada East. He moved to Black River Falls, Wisconsin in 1866.

Career
McGillivray represented the 31s District in the Senate during the 1895 through 1905 sessions. Eventually, he was chosen as its president pro tem. Previously, he had been a member of the Assembly during the 1891 and 1893 sessions. McGillivray was a Republican.

References

External links

British emigrants to the United States
People from Black River Falls, Wisconsin
Republican Party Wisconsin state senators
Republican Party members of the Wisconsin State Assembly
1848 births
1925 deaths
Pre-Confederation Canadian emigrants to the United States